Kriss Kross or similar may refer to:

 Kris Kross, an early 1990s rap/hip hop duo best known for their 1992 hit song "Jump"
 A variation of a Fill-In word puzzle
 "Kriss Kross" (song), a 2008 single by multinational band Guillemots

See also
 Chris Cross (disambiguation)